Si Agimat at Si Enteng Kabisote is a Filipino action comedy and fantasy crossover film directed by Tony Reyes which stars Vic Sotto and Senator Ramon "Bong" Revilla Jr. This was the union of their famous characters, Enteng Kabisote and Agimat respectively, in one blockbuster movie which grossed a  on its opening day. It is followed by a sequel, Si Agimat, si Enteng Kabisote at si Ako. The movie was produced by GMA Pictures.

The film is a seventh movie installment based on the television sitcom, Okay Ka, Fairy Ko!

Premise
Enteng Kabisote (Vic Sotto), a mortal involved with the affairs of the diwata of Encantasia, joins forces with a stern warrior named Agimat (Bong Revilla) in saving their respective worlds from the resurgent evil.

Cast

Main cast
Vic Sotto as Enteng Kabisote
Sen. Bong Revilla Jr. as Agimat
Pauleen Luna as Faye Kabisote
Sam Pinto as Samara

Supporting cast
Aiza Seguerra as Aiza Kabisote
Oyo Boy Sotto as Benok Kabisote
Mikylla Ramirez as Ada Kabisote
Amy Perez as Ina Magenta
Peque Gallaga as Ermitanyo
Bing Loyzaga as Satana
Jeorge Estregan Jr. as Ragat
Benjie Paras as Abugan
Alex Crisano as Balgog 
Jose Manalo as Jose
Wally Bayola as Bodyguard Boggart
Ruby Rodriguez as Amy
Gillian Ward as Bebeng
Barbie Forteza as Bratty
Joshua Dionisio as Jayson

Extended cast
 Marissa Sanchez as Nanay Doray
 Bea Binene as Saling
 Jake Vargas as Odoy
 King Gutierrez as Sartonia
 Saida Diola as Engkantada #1
 Ellen Adarna as Engkantada #2

Special guests
Rufa Mae Quinto
Boobay
Mang Enriquez
Shalala
John Feir 
Marissa Delgado
Bayani Casimiro Jr.

Filming
The filming begin on March 2010 and wrapped up 3 weeks later.

Reaction
While the film opened at #1 on December 25, 2010, with P31,000,000 in ticket sales, it was criticized for being predictable, having sexual innuendos, and having some home-truths as to how Filipino viewers idealize heroism and romance. Also noted is how the film tries to play fair when it comes to mixing the two heroes together.

In an online review, Philbert Ortiz Dy described Si Agimat at si Enteng Kabisote as "really nothing more than a commercial proposition" and that it "took the two highest grossing stars of Filmfests prior and stuffed them together with little rhyme or reason, putting them in the same fantasy adventure settings that made them so successful. There’s precious little love to be found within these frames, all the elements of the film existing for the pure fact that they worked before. This doesn’t even feel like the movie the filmmakers wanted to make."

Although the critical reception was not too good, the movie still ended making P159 million by the end of the festival and went on to have extended showings in theaters.

Accolades
Si Agimat at Si Enteng Kabisote got two awards at the "Gabi ng Parangal" on December 26, 2010.

See also
 Okay Ka, Fairy Ko! (film series)

References

External links

Enteng Kabisote
2010 films
Philippine crossover films
Filipino-language films
GMA Pictures films
OctoArts Films films
APT Entertainment films
M-Zet Productions films
2010s English-language films
Films directed by Tony Y. Reyes